Kızılyer can refer to:

 Kızılyer, Feke
 Kızılyer, Honaz